Hurricane Smith is a 1952 American adventure film directed by Jerry Hopper and starring Yvonne de Carlo, John Ireland, James Craig, Forrest Tucker, Lyle Bettger and Richard Arlen.

Plot
The film is set at an undetermined date but presumably is intended to be in the later 19th century. Costumes vary from 18th century to 1950s. The ship is typical of the early 18th century but with a typical late 19th century name. The frequent discussion of "blackbirding" would place the timeframe in the second half of the 19th century.

Captain Raikes of the ship "The Southern Cross" arrives on an island in the South Pacific Ocean to capture slaves. He rows ashore with his first mate Brown and other crew members, unaware the island is inhabited by three white adventurers who have been stranded there: Hurricane Smith, Dan O'Hara and Brundage.

Smith, O'Hara and Brundage sneak on board "The Southern Cross", overwhelm the remaining crew, and takes over the boat. He sails it to Australia. On the way Smith explains he has buried half a million dollars in Dakaru before being unfairly arrested for piracy. He persuades O'Hara and Brundage to become his partners in retrieving it.

In Australia, the three men rename their ship "The Lady Betty" try to raise money to track down the treasure. They are approached by Eric Gorvahlsen, a scientist who wants to hire a ship. Raikes and Brown arrive in Australia so Hurricane, Dan and Brundage take them prisoner on "The Lady Betty".

Gorvahlsen goes on board the ship with his companions, Dr. Whitmore and Whitmore's half-Polynesian daughter Luana, who is also Gorvahlsen's lover. Gorvahlsen is actually planning to capture Hurricane's treasure on Dakaru. He has never seen Hurricane Smith and suspects that Dan O'Hara is he (the real Hurricane pretends to be "Jim Tyler").

Gorvahlsen tells Luana to find out information about Dan/O'Hara from Hurricane/Tyler. Luana and the real Hurricane fall in love with each other and she admits to having doubts about the scheme.

Raikes and Brown have been released from the brig. They start a knife fight with Brundage and another sailor Clobb, which results in Raikes being sent back to the brig.

Luana falls in the water and Hurricane rescues her from a shark. During this, Brundage accidentally calls Hurricane by his real name and Gorvahlsen notices. He orders Luana to drug Hurricane with gin but she warns him instead. Hurricane swims to the island of Dakaru to prepare the natives for the attack.

Gorvahlsen orders Dan to anchor the ship off Dakaru. Brown then persuades Gorvahlsen to join forces with him and order Dan to release Raikes. Dan then leaves for the island to warn Hurricane.

Hurricane sneaks back on board the boat by which time Brown has caused the crew to be unsettled. Hurricane is thrown in the brig and Clobb kills a sailor. Gorvahlsen takes over the ship, and Clobb encourages the rest of the crew to arm themselves. Gorvahlsen tells the crew about the gold and convinces them to help him claim it.

In Dakaru, Hurricane is forced to lead Gorvahlsen, Brown and Raikes to where the gold has been buried. They dig up the treasure but then Dan leads the natives to attack. Dr. Whitmore spears Gorvahlsen to death and Brundage kills Clobb in a knife fight. Hurricane and Luana are united.

Cast
 Yvonne de Carlo as Luana Whitmore
 John Ireland as Hurricane Smith
 Jame Craig as Govahlsen
 Forrest Tucker as Dan McGuire
 Lyle Bettger as Clobb
 Richard Arlen as Brundage
 Mike Kellin as Dicer
 Murray Matheson as Dr. Whitmore
 Henry Brandon as Sam
 Emile Meyer as Capt. Raikes
 Stuart Randall as Matt Ward
 Ralph Dumke as Ben Hawkins
 Kim Spalding as Brown

Production
The film was based on a 1922 novel Hurricane Williams by Gordon Ray Young. The character had appeared in a number of stories by Young including Wild Blood (1921) and The Vengeance of Hurricane Williams (1926).

In 1951 producer Nat Holt announced he had bought screen rights to the novel and had hired Frank Gruber, one of his regular screenwriters, to adapt it. Edmond O'Brien had just starred in Silver City for Holt (also written by Gruber) and he was mentioned as a possible star.

In August 1951 Holt announced Paulette Goddard would star with Sterling Hayden as a possible co star. However Paramount had a backlog of films at the time and filming was pushed back to the following year.

Eventually the leads were played by Yvonne de Carlo, who had just made Silver City with Holt, and John Ireland. Forrest Tucker and Richard Arlen also played lead roles. James Craig was borrowed from MGM to play the villain. Australian actor Murray Matheson, who had been in Botany Bay, had a small role.

Filming began 11 February 1952. The film featured Kanaka Islanders as extras who had to be "blackened up" by the make up man because the filmmakers felt they were not dark enough.

Reception
"A great deal of muscular action occurs exactly as you'd expect it," wrote the New York Times.

References

External links

Hurricane Smith at TCMDB
Complete copy of novel Hurricane Williams at Internet Archive

1952 films
1950s historical adventure films
American historical adventure films
Films directed by Jerry Hopper
Films set in the 19th century
Seafaring films
Treasure hunt films
Paramount Pictures films
Films scored by Paul Sawtell
1950s English-language films
1950s American films